Euthrix tamahonis is a moth in the  family Lasiocampidae. It is found in Taiwan.

References

Moths described in 1927
Lasiocampidae
Taxa named by Shōnen Matsumura